Basin Mountain in California's eastern Sierra Nevada range is a large and visually prominent peak near the city of Bishop. Basin Mountain is not as tall as its neighboring peaks, Mount Tom and Mount Humphreys, but it dominates the view to the west from Bishop as it rises above the Buttermilks. It is a relatively easy scramble to the top. The summit is not especially notable, except for the wonderful views it offers of Mount Tom, which dominates the skyline just to the north. The night-time views of Bishop and the Owens valley are spectacular.

See also 
 Thirteener

References

External links 
 

Mountains of Inyo County, California
Mountains of the John Muir Wilderness
Inyo National Forest
Owens Valley
North American 4000 m summits
Mountains of Northern California